"The Best of You" is a song by American musician Booker T. Jones and a single from the album The Best of You. The B-side to the single is "Let's Go Dancin'".

Kenny Thomas version

The song was given a new audience in 1991 when the song was covered by English singer Kenny Thomas, retitled "Best of You", from his debut album, Voices (1991). Thomas's version reached  11 in the United Kingdom and also charted in France, Germany, Ireland, the Netherlands, and New Zealand.

Charts

References

1980 singles
1980 songs
1991 singles
Cooltempo Records singles
Kenny Thomas (singer) songs
Song recordings produced by Ian Green
Songs written by Booker T. Jones